John William Dixon Hobley  (11 June 1929 – 4 March 1993) was Attorney General of Bermuda in 1972 and Attorney General of Hong Kong from 1973 to 1979.

Early life
Hobley was born in Southport, Lancashire, England in 1929.  He was the son of John Wilson Hobley and Ethel Anne Hobley.

He was educated at the University School, Southport, Merseyside and the University of Liverpool where he obtained a Bachelor of Laws with Honours.

He was called to the bar of Gray's Inn in 1950 and practiced on the Northern Circuit until 1953.

Career in Hong Kong and Bermuda
Hobley moved to Hong Kong in 1953 and was appointed a Crown Counsel.  In 1962 he was promoted to Senior Crown Counsel and in 1965 to Principal Crown Counsel.

In 1972 he was appointed Attorney General of Bermuda. He returned to Hong Kong one year later to take up the position of Solicitor General. He was almost immediately promoted to Attorney General in the same year when Denys Roberts was promoted to Colonial Secretary. He served as Attorney General until 1979 when he retired. He was succeeded by John Griffiths QC.

Hobley was awarded a CMG in 1976.

From 1985 to 1991, he served as the Principal Legal Adviser to the Wigan Borough Council.

Personal life
Hobley married Dorothy Cockhill on 17 October 1953.  They had a son, Jonathan, and a daughter, Margaret.

His interests were music and bridge.

Death
Hobley died on 4 March 1993.

References

1929 births
1993 deaths
Attorneys General of Hong Kong
Companions of the Order of St Michael and St George
Hong Kong Queen's Counsel
Solicitors General of Hong Kong